The national holding company Uzbekneftegaz is a state-owned holding company of Uzbekistan's oil and gas industry.

History
Uzbekneftegaz was established on May 3, 1992.  In 1998, it was transformed into national holding company.

In line with the reform process of the presidential administration under President Shavkat Mirziyoyev, Uzbekneftegaz is expected to go for an IPO. In December 2022 the Chairman of Uzbekneftegaz was one of a number of public officials who were ordered to work in emergency measures for two months, due to the gas crisis in the country.

Operations

Uzbekineftegaz leads a consortium of Korea National Oil Corporation, China National Petroleum Corporation and Lukoil exploring and developing gas condensate fields in the Aral Sea. It will produce  of gas per year and about 500,000 tons per year of plastics as well as 100,000 tons of petrol which is derived as a bi-product in the process.

Together with another Korean company, Korea National Oil Corporation, Uzbekneftegaz explores Namangan-Tergachi and Chust-Pap oil fields in eastern Uzbekistan.  In August 2008, Uzbekneftegas signed a cooperation agreement with Petrovietnam.  It also cooperates with Lukoil in the Kandym-Khausak-Shady-Kungrad project to develop several natural gas fields in Uzbekistan.

Uzbekneftegaz together with China National Petroleum Corporation owns and operates the Uzbek section of the Central Asia–China gas pipeline.  They also have a joint venture for developing the Mingbulak oilfield.

Together with Sasol and Petronas, Uzbekneftegaz develops Uzbekistan GTL, a gas-to-liquids (GTL) project. In June 2022 GTL launched a synthetic production plant. 

In addition, Uzbekneftegaz has a production sharing agreement with Gazprom on gas exploration, joint ventures with Prista Oil on motor oil and lubricants production, and with Ariston Thermo on heating boilers production.

References

External links
 Company website

Oil and gas companies of Uzbekistan
National oil and gas companies
Energy companies established in 1992
Non-renewable resource companies established in 1992
1992 establishments in Uzbekistan